Garde à Vue (also known as The Inquisitor) is a 1981 French psychological crime drama directed by Claude Miller and starring Romy Schneider, Michel Serrault, Lino Ventura and Guy Marchand. It is based on the 1979 British novel Brainwash, by John Wainwright.

It won the César Award for Best Writing, Best Actor and Best Supporting Actor. The film had 2,098,038 admissions in France and was the 17th-most-attended film of the year.

Plot 
Jérôme Martinaud, a wealthy, influential attorney in a small French town, falls under suspicion for the rape and murder of two little girls. He is the only suspect, but the evidence against him is circumstantial. As the city celebrates New Year's Eve, the police, led by Inspector Antoine Gallien, who is investigating the double rape/murder case, brings the lawyer in for questioning. At first politely, and then less so, the interrogation team consisting of Inspectors Gallien and Marcel Belmont chips away at the suspect's alibi. They interrogate him for hour after hour while Martinaud continues to maintain his innocence. We learn all about the evidence; we meet Martinaud's wife Chantal who tells Gallien about the rift between them and the origin of it, which may be an eight-year-old girl (Camille) Martinaud was in love with. In the face of overwhelming evidence, and feeling let down by his wife, Martinaud confesses to the two rapes and murders. However a fresh corpse is discovered inside the boot of a car that was reported to be stolen, and the car's owner turns out to be guilty of the crime - exonerating Martinaud. Martinaud leaves the police station and finds his wife, who has committed suicide.

Production
Screenwriter Michel Audiard discovered John Wainwright's novel, published in Série noire in 1980, and brought the project to Les Films Ariane. They suggested it to Claude Miller who decided to make Martinaud's character more psychologically complex than he was in the book.

Miller asked Lam Lê to create a complete storyboard for the film before the shooting. Filming started January 27, 1981 and wrapped March 13, 1981. The picture was filmed entirely in a studio and in chronological order.

Reception

It won the César Award for Best Writing, Best Actor, Best Supporting Actor, and Best Editing. The film had 2,098,038 admissions in France and was the 17th-most-attended film of the year.

The film received mixed reviews from English-speaking critics. Time Out said it was "a fine psychological thriller" in which "the potential staginess of the material... is admirably shaken by inspired adaptation, mise en scène and editing." In The New York Times, Janet Maslin called it "a slow, claustrophobic crime melodrama with a lot of talk" but "the actors help keep the film relatively engrossing." Roy Armes wrote that the film "shows Miller's skills at their finest," and added that it is "a pure, hundred-minute spectacle, a story that holds the attention unerringly but which in its unfolding destroys its own painfully built logic."

Awards
1981: Prix Méliès - Best Film

1981: Montreal World Film Festival - Best Screenplay

1982 César Awards:

Best Writing - Claude Miller, Michel Audiard, Jean Herman
Best Actor - Michel Serrault
Best Supporting Actor - Guy Marchand
Best Editing - Albert Jurgenson

Remake 
Garde à Vue was remade in 2000 as Under Suspicion.

References

External links 
 
 

1981 films
1980s psychological thriller films
French psychological thriller films
French neo-noir films
Police detective films
Films scored by Georges Delerue
Films featuring a Best Actor César Award-winning performance
Films featuring a Best Supporting Actor César Award-winning performance
Films directed by Claude Miller
Fiction about suicide
Films based on British novels
Films with screenplays by Michel Audiard
1980s French-language films
1980s French films